Wilbur Walter "Red" White (April 30, 1912 – April 1968) was an American football player. 

A native of Seibert, Colorado, White attended Fort Collins High School and then played college football at Colorado State University. He was selected by the United Press as a first-team halfback on the 1934 All-Rocky Mountain football team.

He also played professional football in the National Football League (NFL) as a back for the Brooklyn Dodgers in 1935 and for the Detroit Lions in 1936. He appeared in 11 NFL games.

References

1912 births
1968 deaths
Colorado State Rams football players
Brooklyn Dodgers (NFL) players
Detroit Lions players
Players of American football from Colorado